Weapon H (Clayton Cortez) is the name of a fictional character appearing in American comic books published by Marvel Comics.

Publication history
The character, created by Greg Pak and Mike Deodato Jr., first appeared in The Totally Awesome Hulk #21 (September 2017) during the "Weapons of Mutant Destruction" storyline.

Weapon H later gained his own comic series that details what he has been up to since the end of the "Weapons of Mutant Destruction" storyline.

Fictional character biography

Origin
Clayton Cortez was an ex-military mercenary working for Eaglestar who was hired to eliminate the villagers in Ujanka for interfering with Roxxon's pipeline work. Feeling remorse for his actions, Clayton killed his own men and spared the villagers. For his betrayal, he was kidnapped and sold to Dr. Aliana Alba of the Weapon X Project's Batch-H division.

Weapons of Mutant Destruction
Clayton was infused with the DNA harvested from Amadeus Cho's Hulk form and Old Man Logan as well as being subjected to the adamantium-bonding and being injected with nanites reverse-engineered from Lady Deathstrike's nanites that was also in the adamantium. Much of his brain was left intact so that he could be better disciplined. Clayton's hybrid form resembles a gray-skinned Hulk with retractable claws and adamantium protrusions on his back, shoulders, and parts of his legs. Eventually, Clayton was released as H-Alpha who along with his more primitive precursor H-Beta fought Amadeus Cho's Hulk form and the current team known as Weapon X, though H-Alpha proved superiority, killing H-Beta before engaging Hulk. Clayton regained much of his humanity, even though he tried to kill Dr. Alba, and soon fled the battle.

Now calling himself Weapon H, Clayton set out to every Eaglestar facility that carried information about himself and his family. Dr. Alba caught up to him and injected nanites into his body so that he would not be able to resist her command. He once again encountered the Weapon X team, but the new Wolverine manage to break him free. Clayton resumed his mission to destroy the Eaglestar facilities.

Targeted by Roxxon
While resisting the change upon joining Roxxon's archaeological expedition to find a Wendigo, Clayton assumed his Weapon H form and saved Roxxon scientist Dr. Ella Stirling from an Ur-Wendigo as Roxxon takes an interest in Weapon H. This also attracted the attention of Doctor Strange, who planned to deal with Weapon H and the Ur-Wendigo. While Weapon H is getting Dr. Stirling to safety, the Ur-Wendigo caught up to Weapon H and took a bite out of his skin causing the Ur-Wendigo to get larger. Doctor Strange showed up to help fight the Ur-Wendigo, but his magic attacks have no effect on the Ur-Wendigo. Using Doctor Strange's Axe of Angarruumus, Weapon H went inside the Ur-Wendigo and killed it from within.

Using the Brood that is in Roxxon's possession, Dario Agger had Dr. Baines unleash Brood-infected wolves, Brood Drones, Brood-infected Space Sharks, and a Brood-infected human named Blake riding an Acanti, to attack Weapon H. With the Brood slain and the Acanti knocked out, Weapon H demanded answers from the Brood-infected human Blake, asking why Roxxon was pursuing him. Blake stated that Roxxon wanted Weapon H to work for them. After mentioning that those who are said to help people actually harm people, Weapon H has Blake forward a message to Roxxon to leave him alone. As Clayton is walking through the Redwood National Forest, Dario instructs Dr. Baines to "initiate the spawn" -- which awakens a spawn of Man-Thing.

After doing some thinking, Clayton is attacked by the spawn of Man-Thing, causing him to turn into Weapon H. Dario speaks through the Fly-Spies, stating that this spawn of Man-Thing had its abilities enhanced with the DNA of Groot. When Dario states that he will find out who he is and who the woman looking for him is, Weapon H sets off the Man-Thing's immolation touch enough to cause a fire in Redwood National Forest. As Weapon H continues his fight with Roxxon's Man-Thing, a woman named Sonia runs into Dr. Ella Stirling, who was also looking for Weapon H. After Weapon H subdues Roxxon's Man-Thing, he tells Dr. Stirling that nobody is supposed to find her, as it is confirmed that Sonia is Clayton's wife. Upon seeing Roxxon's Fly-Spies, Weapon H throws Sonia and Dr. Stirling into the water as he uses his power clap to put out the fires and defeat Roxxon's Man-Thing. A Roxxon aircraft then launches blades into Weapon H to reel him in. The pilot contacts Dario Agger and states that they got Weapon H as Blake warns Dario that Weapon H kills everything. As Weapon H is flown away from Sonia and Dr. Stirling, Dario claims that Weapon H made a noble sacrifice, as he is a hero at heart.

Collaborating with Roxxon
As Weapon H is affected by an Elvish Binding Scroll, Dario Agger introduces himself to him and reviews his creation while also noting that the genetic material of Domino, Lady Deathstrike, Sabretooth, and Warpath are in him. He plans to find out who Weapon H is and plans to make a deal with him. When Weapon H states that every person who says that they want to help people only destroyed them, Dario wanted to destroy those who aren't human. When Weapon H starts acting up, Dario plans to do things the hard way as he has Dr. Baines proceed with the lobotomy. Dr. Baines does so as the effects of the Elvish Binding Scroll starts to wear off. After Ella Stirling shuts down the power to the laboratory, Dario flees leaving the scientist at the mercy of Weapon H. As Weapon H fights the security guards, he finds Blake and Roxxon's Man-Thing in cages as they beg for him to let them out. As Weapon H remembers them, Blake states that Dario used them as tools in exchange for being released from Roxxon's services. Weapon H slashes the cages and tells them that they are on their own. When security robots show up, Weapon H is assisted by Blake and Roxxon's Man-Thing even when Sonia and Dr. Stirling show up. After Weapon H regresses back to Clayton and explains that he had to keep his distance in the event that Roxxon targets her and their kids, Dario arrives wanting the group to hear him out as he explains that Roxxon is wanting to obtain extraterrestrial resources leading him to show the group a portal to an extradimensional region that has magic enough to power the planet for a million years. However, the monsters on the other side of the portal want to kill every human. Sonia advises Clayton to deal with the threat as he transforms into Weapon H.

Dr. Baines reveals to the group that the portal leads to Weirdworld and that the damage to the facility has fractured the portal enough for creatures like the Skrullduggers to get through. Weapon H, Sonia Sung, Dr. Stirling, Blake, and Roxxon's Man-Thing left the building. When an explosion happens when they are outside, Weapon H goes on the defensive when the Skrullduggers emerge from the portal and attack as Blake and Man-Thing join the fight against them. The group discovers that the Skrullduggers are shapeshifters. When Weapon H goes near the Skrullduggers posing as kids, he is attacked by Captain America who thinks that Weapon H is going to harm the children. The two Skrullduggers shed their disguise and try to attack a woman until they are defeated by Weapon H and Captain America. After both of them are reprimanded for their actions by Sonia, Captain America and Weapon H agree to work together to fight the rest of the Skrullduggers.

As Weapon H and Captain America continue their fight with the Skrullduggers, Weapon H thinks back to his childhood where he was beaten by his father, fought some bullies, and was beaten up by prisoners. As Man-Thing secures the defeated Skrullduggers, Captain America states to Weapon H that he was trailing some illegal shipments going from Stane Industries to Roxxon. After Dr. Stirling confirmed that the Skrullduggers came from the Skrull's planet, Dario Agger stated to Weapon H, Captain America, and those present that the Skrullduggers are an invasive species that have no protection under the Multiversal Mineral Rights Exploitation Agreement. Agger still wants Weapon H to deal with the Skrullduggers on behalf of his country as the entire Multiverse wants them dead while Captain America suggests that they follow the interstellar law by contacting the Alpha Flight Space Program. When the Skrullduggers resume their attack, Weapon H and Captain America go on the offensive while Blake and Man-Thing work to keep more Skrullduggers from coming through the portal. After most of them are defeated by Weapon H and Captain America, the Alpha Flight Space Program is contacted to pick up a live Skrulldugger specimen in an armored specimen transport for their xenobiologist to study it only for Dario to have it bombed with missiles. This angers Weapon H as Captain America tries to calm Weapon H. Captain America persuades him to take Dario's offer in order to be his soldier on the inside. When Weapon H and Dario go to check on Blake and Man-Thing 10 minutes later, they find that they have been assisted by Korg in taking a few of the Skrullduggers out.

Journey to Weirdworld
Weapon H hears from Korg that the Roxxon soldiers on Weirdworld are safe in a bunker. Weapon H states that he will undertake a mission in exchange for 1) Roxxon leaving alone himself, Sonia, her kids, and her mom, 2) restoring the Brood-infected human Blake to normal, 3) ten million dollars (for Blake), and 4) Sonia and Dr. Ella Stirling acting as mission control for the mission. In addition, Weapon H learns that Dario has brought in Titania and ex-S.H.I.E.L.D. operative Angel to help out on this field mission. After a talk with Sonia, Clayton is allowed to contact his kids and mother-in-law, this being secretly arranged by Captain America. As Weapon H leads the mission to Weirdworld, they are attacked by a tribe of blue-skinned humanoids who blame them for breaking the Earth and allowing the Skrullduggers to take their queen.

Their captors are revealed to be the Inaku who come from the planet of the same name and have settled on Weirdworld, as Protector Hara mentioned that they blame Roxxon for the death of their fellow Inaku. After Weapon H regressed himself back to normal, he changed again and destroyed Protector Hara's orb, which was a gift from their queen. This led Titania to knock out Protector Hara which resulted in damage to the dome that protected their village from the Skrullduggers, as Clayton reprimands her. While Man-Thing, Korg, and Titania stay with the Inaku in case the Skrullduggers arrive, Weapon H takes Angel and Blake on a stealth mission to find the Roxxon outpost. After being contacted by Dario Agger, Weapon H tells Angel and Blake that Dario "showed his hand" by wanting them to also kill the Skrullduggers. Sonia states that there are three engineers and six Roxxon guards taking refuge, with one of them being Dr. Carrie Espinoza. After a power failure at Roxxon, Dario's latest contact to Weapon H alerts the Skrullduggers outside the outpost. After slaying some of the Skrullduggers, Weapon H, Angel, and Blake make their way into the Roxxon outpost, where they meet the engineers and soldiers there, to rescue them where they have found a way to harness the magic. Weapon H discovers that the magic that they are harvesting is coming from Morgan le Fay of Earth-15238.

Weapon H was against the imprisonment of Morgan le Fay despite Dr. Carrie Espinoza's claim that she is the most dangerous sorceress who ever lived. When Weapon H starts to go on the attack, Angel states that she had no knowledge of what Roxxon was doing with Morgan le Fay -- who in turn advises Weapon H not to listen to Angel's lies. After revealing parts of her backstory, Morgan le Fay states that she found a way to tame the Skrullduggers until Roxxon invaded, took her captive, destroyed her palace, and caused the Skrullduggers to run wild. As Angel tries to prevent Weapon H and Blake from falling into Morgan le Fay's control, Morgan mesmerizes them, claiming that she can cure Blake, and reveals Weapon H's true and full identity of Clayton Cortez (not just "someone named Clayton"). Dr. Espinoza then has a soldier named Granville open the door, enabling the Skrullduggers to get in. After Weapon H blocks the entrance against the Skrullduggers, Morgan le Fay exposes the fact that Angel is actually Black Widow's clone using an Image Inducer, and claims that Captain America sent the clone to spy on Weapon H. Morgan still has Weapon H under her control and regains control of the Skrullduggers. After destroying the facility, Morgan le Fay leads a mind-controlled Weapon H and the Skrullduggers in an attempt at taking over the world.

Now under Morgan le Fay's control, Weapon H leads the attack on the Inaku village, where Morgan le Fay's appearance surprises Korg and Titania. As Morgan le Fay is a queen to the Inaku, they assist Weapon H in attacking Korg and Titania. As Weapon H faces off against Korg, Black Widow/Angel works to get Sonia to get through to Weapon H. Dario Agger takes control of the transmission, stating that he has a map to an escape route for them to use, only to lead them into a box canyon. After knocking out Dario, Sonia takes a speeder and heads to Weirdworld to get to Weapon H. After breaking free from Morgan le Fay's mind-control, Weapon H briefly leaves Weirdworld and returns to have Dario disarm the gun so that he could save the world and his own skin.

After getting Dario to disarm the bomb, Weapon H watches as Dario transforms into Minotaur after taking an attack from Morgan le Fay. As Minotaur fights Morgan le Fay, Weapon H evacuates everyone through the portal. After everyone is evacuated, Weapon H is attacked by Minotaur who states that he ruined everything. As Morgan le Fay's army starts to charge them, Weapon H leaves through the portal stating to Minotaur: "I did your job. Got your people back safe. You wanna stay over here like an idiot and fight to control a world you got no right to? You're on your own". Minotaur barely makes it as Weapon H and Sonia make sure that he pays them the terms of their contract. Dario does provide Clay and Sonia with money to their accounts and new identities. Clay vows that if Dario does anything to his family, he will tear down everything he has.

Hulkverines
In the "Hulkverines" miniseries, Clayton and his family are shown watching the news of Hulk's fight with the Avengers at a restaurant. When they head home, Clayton has a sneezing fit as he asks Sonia to take the kids on a ride. Once they are gone, Clayton heads outside and finds Bruce Banner nearby. Bruce states that the Weapon X project stole his work and used it on him as Clayton states that he was not supportive of that project. As Clayton starts sneezing again, he fights Bruce Banner until night falls and they both assume their respective Hulk forms. When Hulk tries to drain Weapon H's powers, he starts to catch his sneezing fit as well. It turns out that Leader had secretly infected Clayton with a gamma-altering virus. When Weapon H defeats Hulk, Leader arrives begging for Weapon H to finish him off. When Leader threatens his family as part of Plan C, he detonates some bombs near Weapon H in order to get away. Using his tracking skills, Clayton chases after Leader until he runs into Wolverine. Wolverine makes the same accusation towards Clayton that Hulk made toward him. He breaks off the fight and catches up to Leader and Agent NG. As Leader teleports away, Hulk catches up to Clayton and attacks him before he could attack the Shadow Base agents. As Hulk does the job instead, Wolverine evacuates Clayton. At a gas station, Wolverine checks in on Clayton where Wolverine stated that he heard about Weapon H through the investigating that he did. Then they catch up to Hulk at the shores of Lake Erie. As Hulk attacks Clayton, the sun comes up causing Hulk to regress back to Bruce Banner as Clayton and Wolverine dive in and swim him to the underwater hideout of Clayton's family that was described as Plan C. Bruce Banner and Wolverine meet Clayton's family as a recuperating Agent NG learns that they are planning an experiment to do on Hulk and Wolverine. As Plan is being evacuated, an attack by a larger version of Leader's Humanoids impedes them. Weapon H prevents it from attacking his family as the Humanoid makes off with Wolverine and Bruce Banner. After Leader and Dr. Alba unleashed a mutated Hulk and Wolverine on Shadow Base Auto-Op WMD Facility BX91 in Central, Ohio using Green Energy Corp, Weapon H and Sonia catch up to Captain America and Black Widow. Weapon H fights them until he lures them towards Leader and Dr. Alba. When Weapon H destroys the teleporter in Leader's hand, Dr. Alba withdraws the nanobots that were placed in Wolverine and Bruce Banner and places them in Weapon H. It doesn't work on Weapon H as Leader repairs his teleporter enough to get himself and Dr. Alba away from Weapon H. With the threat contained, Weapon H reunites with his family.

War of the Realms
During the "War of the Realms" storyline, Weapon H is among the heroes that are gathered by Captain Marvel to form the War Avengers. When Deadpool is introduced to Weapon H, Deadpool asks what kind of a Hulk he is. Clayton replies he's a soldier and when Captain America asks, he answers the call. When in the Sonoran Desert, Weapon H take down some Frost Giants. The group went to confront Malekith the Accursed in Europe. Malekith dodges the attacks of Weapon H and Winter Soldier. When the War Avengers return to Avengers Mountain after Malekith made off with the Venom Symbiote, they team up with Captain Britain for the final showdown against the Frost Giants.

Absolute Carnage: Weapon Plus
As the symbiote bonded serial killer Cletus Kasady began his escapade to awaken the primordial deity Knull from his slumber. Clayton and his family took refuge in a safehouse at the rural forest planes of Drumheller, Alberta. Thinking of moving out after spending a couple months there in seclusion when the Eaglestar contemporaries came knocking at his door. Remembering how they sold him out to the Weapon Plus program after he went against orders to clear out the Ujankan squatters and shot up his fellow mercs, Weapon H nearly went on a rampage but was halted by Robert James's Urquhart's, his Ex-Commanding officer in the mercenary field, holding Cortez's mother-in-law hostage. 

Urquhart came to Clay revealing he and his outfit are now proud outliers of the Weapon V program; boasting genetically altered klyntar exoskins since they're trading up in the PMC world. They've also come under assault of the recently empowered apostle of the Symbiote God; Carnage himself, as a consequence of their upgrade however. Having the need of assistance from their fellow enhancile to weather the coming storm. Clay would get the rundown about how Weapon V came to be after the failed S.H.I.E.L.D sanctioned Sym-Soldier program flunked during the Vietnam War from the fifth Plus initiative's R&D head Dr. Andrew Breen. Just finishing up about the mass murderer on their trail had somehow made contact with the original proginator whom created the Grendel class specimen which fell from the void of space. The very same which said projects derived its Symbiote samples from just as the crew finally made it to their designated kill field made to entrap the now apotheosized Carnage. Having shutdown the cloned psychic brain used to keep Kasady from tracking Mars Team, Clay and the Venomized super soldiers prepared for a brutal showdown.

Moments later, Dark Carnage makes his attack on the Sym-Soldiers but is met in force by Weapon H. Their battle shakes the warehouse to the core until Dr. Breen, whom had recently come under the influence of the Symbiote God. Offered Clayton amnesty from his chosen ones wrath so long as he leave the team who coerced his obedience at his messiahs mercy. Clayton obliged the corrupted professors offering and left in search of his wife's mother. The two would embrace and Janice told him that her captor released her not out of mercy, but knowing full well she'd die with the light once Knull had been awakened. But Cortez assured her the he would protect her and his family no matter what.

Savage Avengers
On a late night in New York city, having moved himself and his to a more populated area to get away from the constant conflict in his life. Clayton ends up hulking out on a mugger after he attempted to jump him while leaving a local grocery. Due to the misunderstanding he ended up coming in conflict with The Black Knight who originally thought Mr. Cortez was the one in need of help. When a Mad Bomb device went off driving most everyone in the major city area insane with blind rage. The two renounced their tumult in pursuit of finding and shutting off the source of said chaos Eventually coming to a hidden underground chasm where the stolen Alchemax technology had been procured by cultists of Set. But were waylaid by the sudden appearance of other more vicious heroic protectorates the likes of Dardevil (Elektra), Agent Anti-Venom as well as Cloak & Dagger at the sight at Conan of Cimmeria battling against a nanoactive series Deathlok. Sensing a fellow hero in need of help, the six anti-heroes rallied to fight against the reanimated cyber-assassin while shutting off the rage inducing apparatus. Even with the barbarians help, their union was initially overmatched by his would-be assailant. Clay himself being temporarily depowered by a Gamma Siphon which sapped him of his great strength. An ad hock strike at a weakness developed by these unlikely allies caused the Deathlok's temporal drive to malfunction. Sending Conan and his odd contemporaries hurtling through the time stream into distant history. After the temporal conflagration had stabilized, Whitman and Clay landed somewhen in the Hyborian Age of Conan's original birth.

Right in the middle of a celebratory feast held in a fallen brigands honor. The duo would fight their way through a horde of enraged plunderers and vandals while beating a hasty exit towards an open window, while desperately trying to restart his gamma powers. Weapon H discovered a new facility of which that transformed him into a red hybridized version of both a Red Hulk and the Red Harpy gamma transformations, enabling him to fly himself and Black Knight to safety. Eventually, they would reunite with their time displaced number, right as the Deathlok they fought had caught back up with its original target. With some intervention from dagger however, they'd managed to stave off their pursuer while escaping via riverboat. Elektra boasting of a plan to deal with him indefinably along the way.

Conan's group uses the Temple of the Beast to lure Deathlok into a trap. During the fight, Weapon H siphons Deathlok's gamma battery to briefly assume a Red Hulk form. Their fight is crashed by Thulsa Doom and his minions. After Deathlok emits energy and retreats, Weapon H and the rest of Conan's group have found that Thulsa Doom and his followers have made off with Conan.

Weapon H and the others later find where Thulsa Doom took Conan with help from the Cimmerian zombies. During the battle with Thulsa Doom's cult, Weapon H assumes a Leader-like form. Weapon H witnessed Thulsa Doom cutting Conan's neck and using his blood to summon Set.

Powers and abilities
The Weapon X Project's experiments have given Clayton Cortez a Hulk/Wolverine-like appearance with the powers of several inhuman templates, including the Hulk, Wolverine, Domino, Lady Deathstrike, Sabretooth, and Warpath. These abilities include immense strength, durability, and speed, as well as retractable bone claws, regeneration, enhanced senses, and probability field generation (allowing him to influence "luck").  

He possesses a couple of other unique qualities stemming from Sterntech-derived nanorobotics used in his adamantium bonding process. Without this nanotech, Cortez/Weapon H could not transform without his skeleton ripping out of the body. With it, he can manipulate the Adamantium-laced bone structure's pliability, for instance, being able to elongate them protruding along those limbs into needle-pointed spurs capable of shredding his enemies. Unlike Wolverine, Weapon H can also discharge his three-pointed claws as projectile-like stilettos (and aim them at a target with pinpoint precision). This is something even his own creator didn't know about. 

After having his gamma power drained and being left trapped in the past age by Deathlok, Cortez found out that he could modulate the Gamma Core powering this Sterntech-based transformation. Realizing right now, he could also morph into alternate forms of gamma mutates with a different skin pigment to match.  

Prior to his transformations, the Eaglestar Corporation had trained Clayton as a skilled marksman and expert unarmed combatant.

Collected editions

References

Marvel Comics superheroes
Marvel Comics American superheroes
2017 comics debuts
Fictional characters who can manipulate probability
Fictional characters with nuclear or radiation abilities
Fictional characters with superhuman durability or invulnerability
Fictional characters with superhuman senses
Fictional soldiers
Fictional mercenaries in comics
Male characters in comics
Marvel Comics characters who are shapeshifters
Marvel Comics characters who can move at superhuman speeds
Marvel Comics characters with accelerated healing
Marvel Comics characters with superhuman strength
Marvel Comics cyborgs
Marvel Comics mutates